Juan Charrasqueado is a 1948 Mexican Western film directed by Ernesto Cortázar. It stars Pedro Armendáriz, Miroslava, and Fernando Soto. The film's sets were designed by the art director Francisco Marco Chillet.

Cast 
 Pedro Armendáriz as Juan Robledo / Juan Charrasqueado
 Miroslava as María
 Fernando Soto as El Trece
 Arturo Martínez as Luis Coronado
 Luis Aceves Castañeda as El Sota
 Fernando Casanova as Felipe
 Ángel Merino as Fernando
 Carlos Múzquiz as El Malilla
 Georgina Barragán as Charrita
 Silvia Rey
 Conchita Carracedo
 Fernando Curiel as Empleado de Luis
 Amada Dosamantes as Chica pueblerina
 Jaime Fernández as Espectador pelea gallos
 Emilio Garibay as Empleado
 Margarito Luna as Hombre en cantina
 Paco Martínez as Doctor
 Estela Matute as Zarca 
 Francisco Pando as Don Pepe, cantinero
 Víctor Parra
 Luis Pérez Meza
 Matilde Sánchez as Cantante
 Ignacio Villalbazo as Hombre en cantina
 Ana María Villaseñor as Chica en cantina

References

Bibliography 
 Agrasánchez, Rogelio. Mexican Movies in the United States: A History of the Films, Theaters, and Audiences, 1920–1960. McFarland & Company, 2006.

External links 
 

1948 films
1948 Western (genre) films
Films directed by Ernesto Cortázar
Mexican Western (genre) films
Mexican black-and-white films
1940s Spanish-language films
1940s Mexican films